OOO Hyundai Motor Manufacturing Rus is an automobile manufacturer based in Sestroretsk, Russia. The company is a wholly-owned subsidiary of the South Korean Hyundai Motor Company and is considered to be the first full-fledged automobile plant of a foreign automobile plant in the Russian Federation.

History

Hyundai Motor Manufacturing Rus was established on 29 February 2008 and the foundation stone was laid on 5 June.

The press shop was able to start the test run on 19 May 2010. On the occasion of the test run, a small opening ceremony was held among the workforce. A short time later, the pre-production of the new Solaris began, a model that is located as a hatchback in the small car segment and as a sedan in the compact class. The design of the model comes from the Fluidic Sculpture concept study. The engines used come from the Gamma series. The first presentation of the Solaris models took place in August 2010 at the Moscow International Automobile Salon.

Series production finally started with an annual capacity reduced to 105,000 units. With the introduction of the 5-door, the capacity increased to 150,000 units. At full capacity, up to 200,000 automobiles can be produced per year.

In December 2020, Hyundai has completed the acquisition of a decommissioned General Motors manufacturing plant in Shushary, Saint Petersburg, making it the second plant for HMMR.

In September 2021, Hyundai Wia division opened a car engine manufacturing plant in Saint Petersburg, the biggest in Russia and the fifth in the world. The new plant is designed to produce about 330,000 engines for Hyundai Solaris and Creta as well as for Kia Rio by the end of the year 2021. The construction of the plant began in December 2019.

Production 

 Hyundai Solaris (2011–2022)
 Kia Rio (2011–2022)
 Hyundai Creta (2016–2022)

See also 
 List of Hyundai Motor Company manufacturing facilities

References

External links 
 Official website

Hyundai Motor Company
Car manufacturers of Russia
Motor vehicle assembly plants in Russia
Vehicle manufacturing companies established in 2008
2008 establishments in Russia
Russian subsidiaries of foreign companies